Aldo Berni (14 March 1909 – 12 October 1997) was an Italian-born British restaurateur, known for the Berni Inn restaurant chain that he founded with his older brother Frank Berni.

Career
Aldo Berni was born on 14 March 1909 in Bardi, northern Italy. He was the youngest of Louis Berni's three sons.

References

1909 births
1997 deaths
British restaurateurs
People from the Province of Parma
20th-century British businesspeople
Italian emigrants to the United Kingdom